Raymond Brousseau (11 February 1938 – 4 July 2021) was a Canadian film director, screenwriter, art collector, and artist.

Filmography

Director
Points de suspension (1970)
Dimension soleils (1970)
Présenter le pays aux gens d'ici et d'ailleurs (1971)
All Stakes Are Down, No More Bets (1971)
Quelques animaux raisonnables? (1973)
Sens devant derrière (1974)
Canadiens conformes (1974)
A Québécois Rediscovered: Joseph Légaré 1795-1855 (1980)

Screenwriter
Sens devant derrière (1974)
Canadiens conformes (1974)

Public collections
Cinémathèque québécoise
Musée d'art contemporain de Montréal
Musée national des beaux-arts du Québec

References

1938 births
2021 deaths
French Quebecers
Film directors from Montreal
Canadian male screenwriters
Canadian art collectors
Writers from Montreal